Still Ghetto is the second studio album by American R&B singer Jaheim. It was released by Divine Mill Records and Warner Bros. Records on November 5, 2002 in the United States. Released to favorable reviews, it  debuted at number eight on the US Billboard 200 and number three on the Billboard Top R&B/Hip-Hop Albums, with first-week sales of 111,000 copies, eventually reaching platinum for selling a million domestic copies.

The album spawned the hit single "Fabulous" featuring Tha' Rayne as well as the single "Put That Woman First" which entered the top 20 of the US Billboard Hot 100, reaching number 20. The track, "Everywhere I Am" is dedicated to the memory of the singer's parents, who died before he rose to fame.

Critical reception

Allmusic editor John Bush found that "Jaheim's considerable vocal talents only increased during the recording of his second album, and a stronger set of songs made Still Ghetto a definite improvement over the debut [...] For "Everywhere I Am," Jaheim recorded a postcard to his mother, who died before he gained fame; it's another testament to his power as an artist that Still Ghetto never descends into maudlin sentiments. Just like his soul forefathers, everything about Jaheim is honest and heartfelt."

Chart performance
In the United States, Still Ghetto debuted at number eight on the US Billboard 200 and number three on the Top R&B/Hip-Hop Albums, with first-week sales of 111,000 copies. It was certified platinum by the Recording Industry Association of America (RIAA) for selling a million domestic copies.

Track listing

Sample credits
 "Fabulous" contains replayed elements from "Wake Up Everybody" as performed by Harold Melvin & the Blue Notes.
 "Let's Talk About It" contains elements from "Try to Leave Me If You Can But I Bet You Can't Do It" as performed by Bessie Banks.
 "Put That Woman First" contains replayed elements from "I Forgot to Be Your Lover" as performed by William Bell.
 "Backtight" contains elements from "Somebody Told Me" as performed by Teddy Pendergrass.
 "Still Ghetto" contains elements from "I'd Find You Anywhere" as performed by Creative Source.

Charts

Weekly charts

Year-end charts

Certifications

References

Jaheim albums
2002 albums
Warner Records albums